Jurassic World Dominion is a 2022 American science fiction action film directed by Colin Trevorrow, who co-wrote the screenplay with Emily Carmichael from a story by Derek Connolly and Trevorrow. The sequel to Jurassic World: Fallen Kingdom (2018), it is the third and final installment in the Jurassic World trilogy and the sixth installment overall in the Jurassic Park film series, concluding the storyline that started with Jurassic Park (1993). The film has an ensemble cast including Chris Pratt, Bryce Dallas Howard, Laura Dern, Jeff Goldblum, Sam Neill, DeWanda Wise, Mamoudou Athie, BD Wong, and Omar Sy. Dern, Goldblum, and Neill reprise their roles from the Jurassic Park trilogy, appearing together for the first time since the original film.

Jurassic World Dominion is set four years after the events of Fallen Kingdom, with dinosaurs now living alongside humans around the world. The film follows Owen Grady and Claire Dearing as they embark on a rescue mission while Alan Grant and Ellie Sattler team up with Ian Malcolm to expose a conspiracy by the genomics corporation Biosyn, a one-time rival of InGen. Planning for the film began in 2014, before the release of the first Jurassic World film. Filming took place from February to November 2020 in Vancouver, Canada, England's Pinewood Studios, Malta and Switzerland. Legendary Pictures was not involved in the film's production due to the expiration of its four-year partnership with Universal.

Jurassic World Dominion premiered in Mexico City on May 23, 2022, and was released in the United States on June 10, 2022, by Universal Pictures. Like its immediate predecessors, the film was a financial hit and grossed $1 billion worldwide, making it the third-highest-grossing film of 2022, the third film released in the aftermath of the COVID-19 pandemic to gross $1 billion, and the fourth film in the franchise to gross $1 billion. It received generally negative reviews from critics, who felt that the franchise had run its course.

Plot 

Four years after the Lockwood Estate incident and the volcanic eruption on Isla Nublar, once-extinct dinosaurs freely roam the Earth and cause ecological disasters and are subject to animal cruelty. Amid global efforts to control the invasive species, Biosyn Genetics establishes a dinosaur preserve in Italy's Dolomites which conducts genomics research, ostensibly for pharmacological applications.
	
Claire Dearing, Zia Rodriguez, and Franklin Webb, still with the Dinosaur Protection Group, investigate illegal dinosaur breeding sites; Claire's partner, Owen Grady, helps relocate stray dinosaurs. At their remote cabin in the Sierra Nevada Mountains, Claire and Owen secretly raise 14-year-old Maisie Lockwood (Benjamin Lockwood's biogenetic granddaughter) and protect her from nefarious groups seeking to exploit her unique genetic makeup. When Blue, (the Velociraptor raised by Owen), arrives with an asexually-reproduced hatchling, Maisie names it Beta. Increasingly frustrated living in seclusion, Maisie sneaks away, but mercenaries kidnap her and capture Beta.
	
Meanwhile, swarms of giant locusts are decimating U.S. crops. Divorced paleobotanist Dr. Ellie Sattler observes that corporate-grown crops using Biosyn seeds are left uneaten, raising suspicions that they created the insects. Ellie takes a captured locust to her former partner, paleontologist Dr. Alan Grant. They determine that the locust was genetically engineered with Cretaceous-period arthropod DNA and contemporary migratory locusts. 

Franklin, now with the CIA's dangerous-species division, informs Claire and Owen that Maisie may have been taken to Malta. Upon arrival, Claire and Owen infiltrate a dinosaur black market with Owen's former Jurassic World colleague Barry Sembène, who is leading a raid for French Intelligence. Carnivorous dinosaurs are unleashed during the foray, wreaking havoc. Claire and Owen learn that Maisie and Beta were transported to Biosyn, and sympathetic cargo pilot Kayla Watts agrees to fly them there. 
	
Chaotician Dr. Ian Malcolm, now working for Biosyn, has sought Ellie's help to expose CEO Dr. Lewis Dodgson after communications director Ramsay Cole warned him of Dodgson's illegal activities. Dodgson is exploiting dinosaurs and coerces former InGen geneticist Dr. Henry Wu to modify the transgenic locust to modify the world's food supply. Wu denounces the plan, saying it will cause a Ecological collapse as the locusts spread unchecked. Wu meets Maisie and explains that his former colleague, Dr. Charlotte Lockwood (Benjamin Lockwood's deceased daughter), used her own DNA to replicate and give birth to the genetically identical Maisie. Charlotte altered Maisie's DNA to prevent her from inheriting the fatal disease which she had. Wu believes that Maisie and Beta's asexual conception and DNA are key to creating a pathogen to halt the locust outbreak. 
	
A Quetzalcoatlus attacks Kayla's plane in Biosyn's airspace, forcing Owen and Kayla to crash land while Claire is ejected. After separate encounters with a Therizinosaurus, Pyroraptor and Dilophosaurus, the three regroup. Inside Biosyn, Ian and Ramsay guide Ellie and Alan into accessing a restricted lab to obtain a locust DNA sample. They encounter Maisie there, and take her with them. Discovering the breach, Dodgson attempts to incinerate the locusts to destroy evidence; the resulting locusts escape through an air vent, sparking a wildfire around the preserve. 
	
Alan, Ellie, and Maisie barely escape the facility before finding Ian. They meet Owen, Claire and Kayla, with Ramsay later joining them. Dodgson flees with dinosaur embryos via a hyperloop, but becomes trapped in a tunnel after Ellie and Claire reroute the power and is promptly killed by three Dilophosaurus. As the group works together, Owen, with Alan and Maisie's help, captures Beta. They and Wu escape in a Biosyn helicopter during a battle between a Giganotosaurus and the first park's veteran Tyrannosaurus (Rexy), aided by the Therizinosaurus.
	
Ellie and Alan rekindle their relationship before testifying with Ian and Ramsay against Biosyn. Owen, Claire, and Maisie return home and reunite Beta and Blue. Wu releases a host locust carrying the pathogen, gradually eradicating the swarms. Dinosaurs and humans adapt to a new co-existence, and the United Nations declares Biosyn Valley an international dinosaur sanctuary.

Cast 

 Chris Pratt as Owen Grady: Ethologist, US Navy veteran, and former Jurassic World employee responsible for training Velociraptors. Claire's boyfriend and Maisie's adoptive father.
 Bryce Dallas Howard as Claire Dearing: Former Jurassic World manager and founder of the Dinosaur Protection Group. Owen's girlfriend and Maisie's adoptive mother.
 Laura Dern as Dr. Ellie Sattler: Paleobotanist and consultant who traveled to John Hammond's original Jurassic Park.
 Jeff Goldblum as Dr. Ian Malcolm: Chaos theory mathematician, former consultant for Jurassic Park, and a key figure in the San Diego incident depicted in The Lost World: Jurassic Park (1997).
 Sam Neill as Dr. Alan Grant: Paleontologist, a consultant who traveled to John Hammond's original Jurassic Park, and a survivor of the Isla Sorna expedition depicted in Jurassic Park III (2001).
 DeWanda Wise as Kayla Watts: Former US Air Force pilot who aids Owen and Claire on their mission.
 Mamoudou Athie as Ramsay Cole: Head of communications of Biosyn Genetics and Lewis Dodgson's delegate. Secretly allied with Ian Malcolm and his friends to bring Dodgson down.
 Isabella Sermon as Maisie Lockwood: Genetic descendant of Benjamin Lockwood's daughter, Charlotte, whom he raised as his granddaughter, under the care of Owen and Claire. A troubled, courageous and resourceful 14-year-old mentored by Owen in understanding animal behavior, she helps dinosaurs who enter human settlements. Sermon also plays the young Charlotte Lockwood, and Elva Trill plays her as an adult.
 Campbell Scott as Dr. Lewis Dodgson: Biosyn's multi-billionaire CEO who masterminds the abductions of Maisie and Beta and hires Soyona Santos and Henry Wu to sell dinosaurs to the black markets and breed a swarm of giant hybrid locusts. Scott replaces Cameron Thor from Jurassic Park (1993).
 BD Wong as Dr. Henry Wu: Lead geneticist of the dinosaur-cloning programs at Jurassic Park and Jurassic World. Maisie's late mother was one of his colleagues.
 Omar Sy as Barry Sembène: Former animal trainer who worked with Owen at Jurassic World and is now a French Intelligence agent.
 Justice Smith as Franklin Webb: Former Jurassic World technician and dinosaur rights activist.
 Daniella Pineda as Dr. Zia Rodriguez: Paleo-veterinarian and dinosaur-rights activist.

Scott Haze also appears as Rainn Delacourt, a poacher who captures Maisie and Beta for Biosyn; Dichen Lachman appears as Soyona Santos, a dinosaur smuggler; Kristoffer Polaha appears as Wyatt Huntley, a CIA officer working undercover as one of Delacourt's men; Caleb Hearon appears as Jeremy Bernier, a CIA analyst; Freya Parker appears as Denise Roberts, a Biosyn employee; Varada Sethu appears as Shira, a Fish & Wildlife officer, and Dimitri "Vegas" Thivaios appears as a Maltese mercenary.

Production

Development 
During early conversations about Jurassic World (2015), executive producer Steven Spielberg told director Colin Trevorrow that he was interested in having more films made. In April 2014, Trevorrow announced that sequels to Jurassic World had been discussed. He said that they wanted to create something "less arbitrary and episodic", which could "potentially arc into a series that would feel like a complete story". Trevorrow, later asked how much planning he had put into a trilogy while he was filming Jurassic World in 2014, replied that he knew where the story would end. He said that planning the beginning, middle, and end of the trilogy ahead of time "is crucial to a franchise like this if you really want to bring people along with you and make sure they stay interested. It needs to be thought through on that level. It can't be arbitrary [...] the earlier Jurassic Park movies had pretty clear definitive endings. They were much more episodic."

In May 2015, Trevorrow expressed his desire to have different directors work on future films, believing that others could bring different qualities to the series: "I think this is one of those franchises — like Mission: Impossible and like what they're currently doing with Star Wars — that is going to really benefit from new voices and new points of view. […] down the line, looking at the way that franchises have been working, I'm pretty confident this is the right answer for this one. We need to keep it new and keep it changing and constantly let it evolve." He said that the series would not always be about a dinosaur theme park, and future films could explore the concept of dinosaurs and humans co-existing.

Jurassic World producer Frank Marshall confirmed plans for a third Jurassic World film later in 2015, and Universal Pictures chair Donna Langley said that Trevorrow and Spielberg had a story idea for the film. Chris Pratt, who played Owen in Jurassic World, was signed for future films in the series. Trevorrow said that the friendship in Jurassic World between Owen and Barry (played by Omar Sy) could continue into the sequels. He also said that Bryce Dallas Howard's character, Claire, would evolve the most during the Jurassic World trilogy.

Pre-production 
Universal announced in February 2018 that the untitled film, known then as Jurassic World 3, would be released on June 11, 2021. It was also announced that Trevorrow would write the script with Emily Carmichael, based on a story by Trevorrow and writing partner, Derek Connolly (who worked with him on the scripts for the previous Jurassic World films). Like the previous films, Marshall and Patrick Crowley would be producers and Trevorrow and Spielberg would return as executive producers. A month after the announcement, Trevorrow was also confirmed as director. J. A. Bayona had directed the previous installment, Jurassic World: Fallen Kingdom; Trevorrow was inspired by Bayona's work on the film, saying that it "made me want to finish what we started." Spielberg had asked Trevorrow to return as director.

Trevorrow had been set to direct Star Wars: Episode IX before leaving the project in September 2017, and Episode IX was the finale of the Star Wars sequel trilogy. He applied his experience in the Star Wars project, which he viewed as a "practice run" for creating a finale film, to Jurassic World Dominion. People who worked with Trevorrow on Episode IX later joined him for Jurassic World Dominion. Legendary Entertainment co-financed the two previous films but was not involved with the third, since its five-year contract with Universal expired in 2018.

Writing 

Trevorrow met Carmichael in 2015, after seeing a short film of hers. Trevorrow was also impressed with Carmichael's writing on Pacific Rim Uprising (2018) and a remake of The Black Hole, leading him to choose her as a co-writer for Jurassic World 3. Trevorrow and Carmichael were writing the script in April 2018. Trevorrow said that the third film would be a "science thriller", describing it as the Jurassic World film which would most closely match the tone of Jurassic Park (1993). He said about the third film and its predecessors, "I have a dinosaur movie that I've always wanted to see, and it took two movies to earn it." Treverow later described the film as a "celebration of everything that has existed in the franchise up until now", and compared it to the Jason Bourne and James Bond films.

During the development of Jurassic World: Fallen Kingdom in 2015, Trevorrow said that that film's storyline could involve dinosaurs becoming open-source: a number of entities around the world could create their own dinosaurs for a variety of purposes. Scenes and concepts about the integration of dinosaurs into the world were removed from the Jurassic World: Fallen Kingdom script to be saved for the third film and to keep the second film's story focused. According to Bayona, "There were moments that we thought, this is more like a Jurassic [World] 3 scene so we took them out from the script. Some of those scenes we thought were better seen in a world where dinosaurs had spread all over the world. Colin, from time to time, came to me and said, 'I want this character to say that line because this is a moment that's referencing something I want to use in Jurassic 3."

Trevorrow did not want to depict dinosaurs terrorizing cities, which he considered unrealistic. He wanted to honor Michael Crichton's novels Jurassic Park (1990) and The Lost World (1995), believing that humans and dinosaurs "battling it out in the city streets is a different kind of film than what he would've done". Treverow described a world where "a dinosaur might run out in front of your car on a foggy backroad, or invade your campground looking for food. A world where dinosaur interaction is unlikely but possible—the same way we watch out for bears or sharks. We hunt animals, we traffic them, we herd them, we breed them, we invade their territory and pay the price, but we don't go to war with them."

About the film's realism, Trevorrow said that dinosaurs would not be "everywhere all the time. I think any kind of global acceptance that they are just around doesn't feel real to me because, even now when you think of animals, when was the last time you saw a tiger walking down the street? We know there are tigers. We know they're out there. But to me, it's very important that we keep this grounded in the context of our relationship with wild animals today." For inspiration, he watched episodes of Planet Earth and alien-invasion films with a realistic perspective. Trevorrow said that his goal for the Jurassic World trilogy was to have Claire's line from the first film ("No one is impressed by a dinosaur anymore") disproved in the final film.

With input from Carmichael and cast members, the film's storyline evolved from Trevorrow's initial vision. During production of the previous Jurassic World films, Howard kept a list of possible ideas for the final film (including a baby raptor and an underground dinosaur market in Malta). Trevorrow consulted the list while writing the script with Carmichael. He considered the Malta black market a departure from the dinosaur-auction scene in Fallen Kingdom: "I felt that what would really happen is a hive of scum and villainy. I wanted to see that".

The writers wanted Dr. Ellie Sattler, a paleobotanist in the Jurassic Park trilogy, to lead the story in Dominion. Trevorrow consulted scientists for story ideas, seeking to depict a global ecological crisis caused by genetic tampering which would be first noticed by a paleobotanist. He learned about Insect Allies (a DARPA program in which insects spread pesticides to crops), which inspired the film's locust plot. Trevorrow and Carmichael also consulted with screenwriters Michael Arndt, Krysty Wilson-Cairns and David Koepp, who wrote the first two Jurassic Park films.

Trevorrow wanted the film to explore the idea of dinosaurs created by people other than Dr. Henry Wu. He said that Wu as the only person who knew how to create a dinosaur was far-fetched "after 30 years of this technology existing" in the films' universe. Biosyn, which appears in Crichton's novels but is absent from their film adaptations, debuts in Dominion. Trevorrow also wanted to see the return of Lewis Dodgson, a prominent character in the novels who appeared only briefly in the first Jurassic Park film.

Other returning characters from the original trilogy included Dr. Alan Grant and Dr. Ian Malcolm, rejoining Ellie Sattler. According to Trevorrow, striking a balance of screen time for the trio and the newer characters was the most difficult aspect of developing the film's story. Wu, who also appeared in the first film and the Jurassic World films, returned as well. Other characters from the series – including Lex and Tim Murphy and Kelly Curtis – were considered, but Trevorrow felt that the film had enough returning characters. Spielberg advised Trevorrow to remember the importance of the film's characters: "Don't forget that these are humans. These are real people, scientists, parents going through something spectacular, something fantastic".

Casting 
In 2017, Laura Dern (who played Dr. Ellie Sattler in the Jurassic Park trilogy) expressed an interest in reprising her role. Trevorrow announced in April 2018 that Pratt and Howard would reprise their roles in the previous films, and other characters in Fallen Kingdom "you'll realize [as] major characters". Howard said later that year that her main desire for the film was to include more characters from the Jurassic Park trilogy, including Ellie Sattler and  Ian Malcolm (Jeff Goldblum). Trevorrow said that Sam Neill and Dern might reprise their roles in the film; Neill had played Dr. Alan Grant in earlier films.

In September 2019, Neill, Dern, and Goldblum were confirmed as returning in major roles. They appear throughout the film, Neill and Dern's first appearances in the series since Jurassic Park III (2001). It was the trio's first film appearance together since the original Jurassic Park film, although Goldblum briefly reprised his role in Fallen Kingdom. Goldblum and Neill had starred in their own Jurassic Park sequel, but Trevorrow considered Dominion as Dern's film because its plot is partially driven by her character. Trevorrow collaborated with the three actors to ensure that their characters would be consistent. He said that the film would answer questions about the characters: "Who are these people now? What do they make of the new world they're living in, and how do they feel about being part of its history?" Trevorrow, Dern and Neill agreed about having Grant and Sattler reunite romantically. Neill said that he would get into shape for his role by running.

Mamoudou Athie and DeWanda Wise were cast in lead roles in October 2019 without auditioning. Trevorrow was impressed by Athie's performance in The Front Runner (2018), and Wise was cast after Trevorrow saw her in the television series She's Gotta Have It. At the end of 2019, Justice Smith and Daniella Pineda were confirmed as reprising their roles in Fallen Kingdom; Isabella Sermon would also return as Maisie from that film. In early 2020, Jake Johnson and Omar Sy were announced as reprising their roles from Jurassic World, and Dichen Lachman and Scott Haze were cast. BD Wong was confirmed as reprising his role as Dr. Henry Wu. Campbell Scott was cast in June 2020 as Dodgson; the role, played by Cameron Thor in the original Jurassic Park, was recast for Jurassic World Dominion after Thor's imprisonment for sexual assault. Pratt compared Jurassic World Dominion to Avengers: Endgame (2019), another film in which he appeared; a number of characters returned to both from previous films. Andy Buckley (Scott Mitchell in Jurassic World) said that he had been signed to reprise his role, but his character was dropped in a rewrite.

Filming 
On February 19, 2020, a production unit used drones to film aerial scenes at Cathedral Grove on Canada's Vancouver Island. Principal photography began in British Columbia on February 24, and the film's title was announced the following day as Jurassic World Dominion. Canadian filming ended in early March 2020. Production moved to England, where a major location was Pinewood Studios (the facility used for Fallen Kingdom). Filming was also done in Malta.

The film's budget was between $165 million and $185 million. John Schwartzman was its cinematographer, returning to the position after working with Trevorrow on the first Jurassic World film and in the process, becoming the first person to serve as director of photography on two Jurassic Park films. Schwartzman shot the film with 35mm film, 65mm film, and VistaVision. Some night scenes were shot digitally to aid the visual effects team during post-production. It had the working title of Arcadia, the name of the ship which transported dinosaurs to the U.S. mainland in the previous film.

COVID-19 pandemic 
Filming went on hiatus in March 2020 as a safety precaution due to the COVID-19 pandemic, and a decision about resuming production was originally expected within several weeks. During the delay, the filmmakers saved time by doing post-production work on footage already shot. Most of these scenes included dinosaurs, allowing the visual effects team to get started on the creatures.

Universal eventually confirmed that filming would resume in July 2020 at Pinewood Studios. The company planned to spend about $5 million on safety protocols, including thousands of COVID-19 tests for each cast and crew member (who would be tested before production resumed and several times during filming). A medical facility would be commissioned to perform the tests, and doctors and nurses would be on site during filming. The cast and crew would receive COVID-19 training, and the Pinewood set would include 150 hand-sanitizer stations and 1,800 safety signs to remind them of safety precautions such as social distancing. Walk-through temperature-testing stations would be built. All members of the production team would be required to wear masks, except for the actors during filming. The cast received a 109-page document outlining the safety protocols. The 750-person production team was divided into two groups, with the larger group consisting of crew members involved in construction, props, and other pre-filming activities. The smaller group consisted of Trevorrow, the cast, and essential crew members.

Filming resumed on July 6, 2020. An English hotel was rented by Universal for the remainder of the shoot, allowing the cast and crew to quarantine for two weeks before filming resumed. After quarantine, they were allowed to roam the hotel without social distancing or mask-wearing. The cast and hotel employees were tested three times a week. Renting the hotel, combined with the COVID-19 precautions, convinced the cast that it would be safe to resume filming because the hotel was a protective "bubble" for the cast and crew. Trevorrow encouraged the cast to make suggestions regarding their characters. He and the cast formed a close relationship while they lived together for four months, allowing them to create the characters "in a way that I never would have had the opportunity to do" if not for the pandemic protocols. The safety measures cost approximately $9 million, including the hotel. Jurassic World Dominion was one of the first major films to resume production during the pandemic, and was an example to other major productions on how to resume. Universal considered the film ideal to resume; it required few real locations outside of the studio sets, and had a relatively-small cast and few extras. The earlier start of filming in England also made it easier to resume.

Neill, Dern and Goldblum began filming in early August. By that time, four crew members in England had tested positive for COVID-19; another four tested positive in Malta after arriving there before production. The main crew was scheduled to shoot in Malta with Pratt, Howard and Neill, although these plans were canceled after an increase in COVID-19 cases. As a result of the increase, the United Kingdom added Malta to its list of countries from which arrivals must quarantine for 14 days. Scenes set in Malta were rewritten by Trevorrow, and sets were reconfigured to continue the filming. The actors were no longer part of the Malta shoot, which was handled by a second unit. Filming in Malta began at the end of August, and continued into September. After the Malta shoot, filming continued at Pinewood Studios.

Because of the rescheduling caused by the pandemic, Trevorrow and Johnson struggled to find an ideal time in Johnson's schedule for filming. Johnson ultimately had to drop out of the project because of quarantine and travel restrictions which prevented him from reaching the set. Pineda appeared early in the film, and was meant to film a later scene, but quarantine restrictions interfered with these plans. Varada Sethu was signed to replace her in the later scene as a different character.

Filming was slowed on October 7, after several people tested positive for COVID-19. Although the individuals later tested negative, the film's safety protocols required a two-week quarantine. During the partial shutdown, the main cast members continued to film secondary scenes before full production resumed later in the month. Shooting ended on November 7, after nearly 100 days. Like the previous films, Spielberg was minimally involved during filming; COVID-19 protocols would have prevented him from visiting the set.

Locations and sets
Trevorrow wanted the film to take place in locations not previously featured in the series, including Malta and the Dolomites. Location shooting was preferred to sets, and blue screens were rarely used. Jurassic World Dominion is the first film in the franchise with dinosaurs in a snowy environment. Some scenes, set in the Sierra Nevada, were filmed in British Columbia during a snowy winter. Merritt was among the British Columbia locations, which included its downtown and a lumber yard. In an early scene, Owen and others ride horses to herd a group of Parasaurolophus. For years, Trevorrow had wanted to introduce such a scene (also filmed in British Columbia). It was influenced by the 1969 film The Valley of Gwangi and 1960s and 1970s Western films set in snowy landscapes.

Filming at Pinewood Studios included the 007 Stage, where large sets were assembled. A total of 112 sets were built for the film, including the black market. Another set was the interior of Kayla's C-119 cargo plane, and a miniature plane was used for exterior shots.

Other filming locations in England included Hawley Common, where part of the previous film was shot. Filming in Hawley Common and Minley Woods was done over three nights, with helicopter filming on the final night. These locations were used for a drive-in-theater scene with a T. rex which was cut from the film's theatrical version. Winterfold Forest was used for some scenes set in the Sierra Nevada, including Owen and Claire's cabin. Another scene was shot at a farm near Aylesbury, used as a Texas farm where Ellie Sattler investigates the locust outbreak.

Several locations were used for Biosyn headquarters, including Blavatnik School of Government and Wolfson College (both part of the University of Oxford. A lecture hall at Wolfson was used for a scene introducing Malcolm as he makes a speech. Black Park, adjacent to Pinewood Studios, was used for Biosyn's exterior with two British Columbia locations: Cathedral Grove and the town of Squamish. Switzerland's Grande Dixence Dam and its surrounding mountains were digitally scanned during wintertime and recreated in the film as a frozen Biosyn dam. Kayla's crashed plane in the frozen lake was an exterior set at Pinewood, and the distant mountains in the background were added with blue screens. The Dolomites mountains were also scanned and added into the film. Biosyn's locust lab was a set, which Dodgson eventually sets afire. Trevorrow had planned to use special effects for the fire, but agreed to burn down the set at the suggestion of special-effects supervisor Paul Corbould. Eight or nine cameras filmed the set as it burned.

Filming in Malta included Valletta, its capital. Malta was chosen as a location after the country's film commission presented financial incentives in April 2019 in the hope of attracting the project to the area. Trevorrow also chose it because he wanted to see "dinosaurs around old stones, around something that's ancient to us, just to illustrate how much more ancient these things are". Because Pratt and Howard could not travel to Malta, they were filmed with stunt doubles and their faces were added digitally during post-production. Valletta's streets were scanned with lidar, allowing Pratt and Howard to act against a blue screen of the city. In a Valletta chase scene, an Atrociraptor pack pursues Claire across rooftops while Owen flees the dinosaurs on motorcycle. Shooting the chase was complicated, and required up to nine cameras filming simultaneously. Pratt filmed his part of the chase in a UK blue-screen studio, riding a stationary bike on a treadmill. A car-crash scene was filmed in the town of Floriana. Malta is itself in the film except for Mellieħa, which was part of Grant's dig site in Utah.

Creatures 

Jurassic World Dominion features 35 dinosaur species. The film uses more animatronic dinosaurs than the previous Jurassic World films did. Eighteen animatronics of various sizes were created for the film by designer John Nolan. Partial animatronics and puppetry were also used. Like the previous films, Industrial Light & Magic (ILM) worked on CGI versions of the animals. Animatronics and puppets were used for close-ups with humans, and CGI was used for certain movements. ILM scanned miniature clay maquettes of each dinosaur to create a digital version, which was then given to Nolan's team to create the dinosaurs.

Paleontologist Jack Horner, a longtime advisor for the series, returned for Dominion. Paleontologist Steve Brusatte was also a consultant. Trevorrow wanted to strike a balance between realism and "awesome-movie-scary". Jurassic Park III had featured Velociraptors with quills along the head, but Dominion (and a five-minute prologue) introduces feathered dinosaurs to the series. Within the previous films' storyline, the dinosaurs were created by InGen and partially engineered with frog DNA to explain inaccuracies in their appearance. In Dominion, feathered dinosaurs are introduced with advanced methods by Biosyn. Pyroraptor and Therizinosaurus are among the feathered dinosaurs introduced in the film. Nolan and ILM researched to accurately simulate feathers. Trevorrow intended the Therizinosaurus encounter with Claire to be a "quiet and still and suspenseful" scene, more similar to the original Jurassic Park than the action scenes in the Jurassic World trilogy. He noted that Claire "never really had even one sequence where it was just her alone with a dinosaur".

The film's dinosaur antagonist is a Giganotosaurus, which Trevorrow saved for the trilogy's final installment to set up a rivalry with the T. rex from Isla Nublar seen in previous films. He said about the Giganotosaurus, "I wanted something that felt like the Joker. It just wants to watch the world burn". The showdown between the dinosaurs was written by Trevorrow; he filmed it primarily from the humans' perspective, hoping that this would "make it feel like it was actually happening to you". An animatronic Giganotosaurus was created, which Nolan said was "probably the biggest challenge" for his team. The dinosaur was expected to take six months to build, but his team only had about four months to finish it. Trevorrow wanted to reuse an animatronic created for Fallen Kingdom for the T. rex, but it had deteriorated (common with animatronics).

Dimetrodon, a synapsid which existed before the dinosaurs, also appears in the film. Although the creature had appeared in franchise merchandise over the years, Dominion was its film debut. Another new creature is the Atrociraptor, which Trevorrow described as brutish compared to Velociraptors. Hybrid dinosaurs had prominent roles in the earlier Jurassic World films, but none appear in Dominion because Trevorrow felt that the concept had "narratively run its course". Among the returning dinosaurs is Dilophosaurus, appearing in the flesh for the first time since the original Jurassic Park film. Like the first film, no CGI was used to create the Dilophosaurus (the only dinosaur in the film without a digital model). Nolan created animatronic locusts  in length.

Post-production 
After filming ended, Trevorrow worked on post-production in a converted barn behind his UK home. The film's release had been delayed for a year due to the pandemic, allowing Trevorrow time to work on visual effects, sound mixing, and scoring as separate processes (unlike most films). When the visual effects were almost done, he screened the nearly-finished film for friends and Jurassic Park fans to obtain feedback and make improvements. Trevorrow said that it was a "much more involved process with the audience this time".

The film was completed on November 6, 2021. With a runtime of two hours and 26 minutes, it is the longest film in the Jurassic Park series. The film was initially two hours and 40 minutes, prompting concern from the studio about whether moviegoers would watch such a long film during a pandemic. Trevorrow then worked to shorten the theatrical cut to under  hours, although he expressed interest in releasing a director's cut with the deleted footage.

About fourteen minutes were removed from the theatrical cut, including five minutes which were released online as a prologue. Other deleted scenes include a fight between an Oviraptor and a Lystrosaurus in the black market and a two-minute confrontation between Ramsay and Dodgson. The home-media release includes an extended cut with the deleted scenes restored; Trevorrow preferred the extended version, his original vision of the film.

Music 

The film's music was composed by Michael Giacchino, who scored the previous Jurassic World films. It was recorded at England's Abbey Road Studios over a 10-day period which ended in May 2021. Like his previous Jurassic World scores, Giacchino incorporated themes from John Williams's earlier Jurassic Park soundtracks. The score, distributed by Back Lot Music, was digitally released on June 3, 2022, and physically released three weeks later.

Marketing 

A five-minute preview of the film was released in June 2021 with IMAX screenings of F9. Trevorrow had intended for the footage to be the film's first five minutes before removing it from the theatrical cut. The footage was posted online on November 23, 2021, as a standalone short film and prologue for Jurassic World Dominion. It is also included in the film's extended home media release. The prologue, which includes a Cretaceous segment where a Giganotosaurus kills a T. rex in battle, establishes the main film's rivalry between the cloned dinosaurs.

Universal partnered with Olympians Mikaela Shiffrin, Nathan Chen, and Shaun White, who appeared in commercials promoting the film and the 2022 Winter Olympics. In the ads, each athlete has a dinosaur encounter in a snowy environment.

The first trailer was released online on February 10, 2022, four months before the film's release and later than those for previous Jurassic World films. Broadcast during Super Bowl LVI, it had 86 million views on social media websites during the 24 hours after it airednearly three times the post-Super Bowl traffic of Jurassic World: Fallen Kingdom. A second trailer was released on April 28. Universal established an in-universe website for the fictional Department of Prehistoric Wildlife (DPW) a month before the film's release, with dinosaur sightings around the world. An exhibit in London's Trafalgar Square several weeks before the film's release included an interactive billboard with the Giganotosaurus, which reacted to people passing by.

Mattel and The Lego Group sold toys based on the film, as did Funko and Bandai's Tamagotchi. An expansion pack tied into the film was released for the video game Jurassic World Evolution 2 shortly after its theatrical premiere. The Smithsonian Institution produced educational products based on the film. Barbasol released limited-edition cans of its shaving cream with dinosaurs from the film. Jeep, several of whose vehicles appeared in Dominion, aired a dinosaur-themed commercial as a tie-in to the film. Other promotional partners included CKE Restaurants and Ten Thousand Villages.

Release

Theaters 
Jurassic World Dominion premiered in Mexico City on May 23, 2022, and began its theatrical rollout on June 1 in Mexico and South Korea. In the United States, Dominion was released theatrically by Universal Pictures on June 10; its scheduled release on June 11, 2021, was delayed by the pandemic.

Home media 
The film was released for digital purchase and rental on July 14, 2022 and was released on 4K Ultra HD, Blu-ray and DVD on August 16. Its home video release includes an extended version of Jurassic World Dominion with the 14 minutes of cut footage restored, bringing the total runtime to 160 minutes.

In the United States, the theatrical and extended versions debuted on Universal's Peacock website on September 2, 2022, as part of an 18-month deal in which the film will move to Amazon Prime Video for 10 months before returning to Peacock for a final four months. After the 18-month deal, it will air on Starz as part of Universal's Post Pay-One licensing agreement with the network.

In Europe, the movie made its television premiere over the course of December 2022 and January 2023 trough Sky in the UK, Italy and Germany, Canal+ in France and Movistar Plus+ in Spain. The movie also became available for streaming on SkyShowtime in Portugal on January 22, 2023.

Reception

Box office 
Jurassic World Dominion grossed $376.9 million in the United States and Canada, and $626.9 million in other territories, for a worldwide total of $1.004 billion. It is the third-highest-grossing film of 2022, and was the 50th film to pass the billion-dollar mark, the fourth Jurassic film, and the third film released during the COVID-19 pandemic (after Spider-Man: No Way Home and Top Gun: Maverick).

In the U.S. and Canada, the film was expected to gross about $125 million from 4,676 theaters in its opening weekend. After making $59.55 million on its first day (including $18 million from Thursday night previews, just below the first Jurassic Worlds $18.5 million and above Fallen Kingdoms $15.3 million), weekend estimates were raised to $142 million. Its debut earnings were $145.1 million, topping the box office. It was the best opening weekend for a non-superhero film during the pandemic, with Deadline Hollywood calling its performance "amazing" given its unfavorable critical reception and mediocre audience-exit scores. This was the fourth-highest opening weekend for a Universal film, behind its two predecessors and Furious 7 (2015). When it opened, it had the third-highest number of screens of any film, behind The Lion King (2019) and Top Gun: Maverick. The film earned $59.2 million in its second weekend (a drop of 59%), topping newcomer Lightyear to remain in first place. In its third weekend, it earned $26.7 million and fell to third place behind newcomer Elvis and Top Gun: Maverick. It ended its box office run as the fifth highest-grossing film of 2022 in this region.

Outside the U.S. and Canada, the film earned $55.7 million in 15 early offshore markets and $178 million in 72 markets during its second weekend. It added $76.1 million during its third weekend (topping the box office in countries experiencing heat waves such as the UK, France, and Germany), and another $43 million in its fourth. By the film's fifth weekend, it was the fourth Hollywood film since the start of the pandemic to pass the $800 million mark. Worldwide IMAX earnings totaled $53.5 million by October 2, 2022, with the top markets China ($157.6 million), Japan ($46 million), Mexico ($43 million), the United Kingdom ($42.9 million), and France ($29.5 million).

Critical response 
  It is the lowest-rated film of the series on both websites. Audiences polled by CinemaScore gave the film an average grade of "A–" on an A+ to F scale, while PostTrak reported that filmgoers gave it a 73% overall positive score, with 57% saying that they would definitely recommend it.

Michael Phillips of the Chicago Tribune gave the film two out of four stars, describing Dominion as the franchise's weakest entry, criticizing its dialogue and calling Owen and Claire "thinly conceived".  For Rolling Stone, David Fear wrote that compared to the original Jurassic Park, "Dominion feels like a contractual obligation at best, and a D.O.A. attempt to wring one last drop out of an already depleted brand at worst." According to a Variety review, "Of the three Jurassic World movies, Dominion is the least silly and most entertaining. But that's not saying much. This 'stop to ask if they should' cycle's human characters were never especially interesting, and why should we trust Trevorrow to suddenly make them so?" The Jewish Chronicle critic Linda Marric gave the film two out of five stars and wrote, "Overall, and bar a few good performances, Dominion fails on almost all accounts by delivering a story that is too preposterous even for a franchise that has demanded that we suspend disbelief for the last 3 decades."

Other reviews were mixed. Mark Feeney of The Boston Globe wrote, "The movie has its moments, and the CGI really is fabulous, but this go-round feels fairly tired. It's also too long, and much of it is paced in a somewhat ... leisurely? ... fashion." For Tribune News Service, Katie Walsh praised the performances of newcomers DeWanda Wise and Mamoudou Athie and called the motorcycle chase scene "the film's best, and most innovative, set piece" but called Dominion "not exactly satisfying, lacking in true suspense, tension and the kind of thrilling spectacle that Spielberg so effortlessly mastered in the first Jurassic Park, a cinematic high that we'll be chasing forever".

The return of Sattler, Grant and Malcolm received mixed reception. Bilge Ebiri of Vulture.com wrote, "While it's certainly nice to see Dern, Neill, and Goldblum play these people again, it'd be nicer if the script gave them well-written dialogue or placed them in interesting situations". Maggie Boccella of Collider praised their acting but was also critical of the writing. She stated that the trio "feel like aimless last-minute additions, like their presence only serves to remind audiences of how good things used to be". Ian Freer of Empire praised their return, stating that it "provides a sharp contrast" to Owen and Claire, the "relatively colourless heroes of the later trilogy". Mashable's Kristy Puchko felt that the trio were given little to do in the film. According to Johnny Oleksinski of the New York Post, "You'd think it would be nostalgic to see Dern, Neill and Jeff Goldblum together again, but they all act like old fogies, and they're written to sound like morons". Zoe Jordan of Screen Rant opined that the film "undermines the unique characteristics that define" the trio. David Crow, writing for Den of Geek, praised the romantic reunion between Grant and Sattler.

Several publications criticized the film for its locust story, feeling that it sidelined the dinosaurs. Chase Hutchinson of Collider wrote, "If you were expecting a story that actually grappled with what the impact of the dinosaurs would be on the world, then you are in for a big letdown". John Squires of Bloody Disgusting stated that Dominion "makes the bizarre decision to skirt around the issue presented in the final moments of Fallen Kingdom, instead jumping four years" and picking up in a world where dinosaurs are "little more than a minor nuisance" to humans. In contrast, Kimberly Terasaki of The Mary Sue stated that "the biggest threat to the world has never been the dinosaurs, but the technology and corporations that created them". Explaining his decision to feature the locusts, Trevorrow said that he "wanted to make a film about genetic power and its consequences".

The extended edition received more favorable reviews and is considered an improvement over the theatrical cut. Samantha Coley of Collider praised it for adding story depth and fixing "some clunky editing issues". John Orquiola of Screen Rant praised the extended edition for restoring the prologue sequence and more character moments. Jesse Hassenger of Polygon recommended the extended edition but stated that the additional scenes "play to the movie's strengths and weaknesses — which is to say the dinosaur stuff is fun, and the human stuff is a bit half-assed".

Accolades

Future 

Jurassic World Dominion concludes the second film trilogy (and the storyline which began in the original trilogy), although Marshall has not ruled out the possibility of future films. In January 2022, he said: "We're going to sit down, and we're going to see what the future is."

Notes

References

External links 
 
 
 

2022 films
2022 3D films
2022 action adventure films
2022 science fiction action films
2020s English-language films
2020s monster movies
2020s science fiction adventure films
2020s American films
4DX films
Amblin Entertainment films
American 3D films
American action adventure films
American chase films
American science fiction action films
American science fiction adventure films
American monster movies
American sequel films
Film productions suspended due to the COVID-19 pandemic
Films about agriculture
Films about child abduction in the United States
Films about animal cruelty
Films about dinosaurs
Films about families
Films about genetic engineering
Films about insects
Films about orphans
Films about the Central Intelligence Agency
Films about whistleblowing
Films about wildfires
Films directed by Colin Trevorrow
Films postponed due to the COVID-19 pandemic
Films produced by Frank Marshall
Films scored by Michael Giacchino
Films set in the Alps
Films set in the Pacific Ocean
Films set in Italy
Films set in Malta
Films set in Nevada
Films set in Pennsylvania
Films set in San Francisco
Films set in Texas
Films set in Utah
Films set in Washington, D.C.
Films set in 2022
Films shot in British Columbia
Films shot in Hampshire
Films shot in Malta
Films shot at Pinewood Studios
Giant monster films
IMAX films
Jurassic Park films
The Kennedy/Marshall Company films
Universal Pictures films